"Till I'm Too Old to Die Young" is a song recorded by American country music artist Moe Bandy. It was released in February 1987 as the second single from his album You Haven't Heard the Last of Me. The song peaked at number 6 on the Billboard Hot Country Singles chart.

The song was also released on the 2004 album You Can't Save Everybody by Kieran Kane and Kevin Welch with Fats Kaplin; and was released under the title "Too Old to Die Young" on the 2006 album Adieu False Heart by Linda Ronstadt with Ann Savoy.

Charts

Weekly charts

Year-end charts

References

1987 singles
Moe Bandy songs
MCA Records singles
Curb Records singles
Songs written by Kevin Welch
Song recordings produced by Jerry Kennedy